Scott Henry (born 20 January 1987) is a Scottish professional golfer. He won the 2012 Kazakhstan Open on the Challenge Tour.

Amateur career
Henry had a successful junior career winning a number of Scottish boys titles and playing in the Jacques Léglise Trophy in 2004 and 2005, captaining the Great Britain & Ireland team on the latter occasion.  He won the Scottish Stroke Play Championship in 2006. He turned professional in 2007.

Professional career
Henry played on the Challenge Tour in 2009 with little success. He returned to the tour in 2012, winning his first title at the Kazakhstan Open. He finished 11th in the Order of Merit to gain a place on the European Tour for 2013. His best finish in 2013 was joint fourth in the Johnnie Walker Championship at Gleneagles and from 2014 to 2016 he played mainly on the Challenge Tour. In 2014 he lost in a playoff for the Madeira Islands Open, a joint European Tour/Challenge Tour event and came second again in the same event in 2015. In 2016 he was joint runner-up in the Vierumäki Finnish Challenge. At the end of 2016 he finished joint second in the European Tour Q-school to gain a place on the main tour for 2017. 2017 was a disappointing season and he returned to the Challenge Tour for 2018.

Henry missed out on his second Challenge Tour win after finishing 6-5-6 at the 2018 Galgorm Resort & Spa Northern Ireland Open. He had led by three strokes after 15 holes and finished tied for second place, a stroke behind Calum Hill.

Personal
Henry is married to Ladies European Tour golfer Kylie Walker. They competed against each other in the Jordan Mixed Open.

Amateur wins
2004 Scottish Boys Championship, Scottish Boys Stroke Play Championship
2005 Scottish Boys Championship
2006 Scottish Stroke Play Championship

Professional wins (2)

Challenge Tour wins (1)

Challenge Tour playoff record (1–1)

Alps Tour wins (1)

Playoff record
European Tour playoff record (0–1)

Team appearances
Amateur
Jacques Léglise Trophy (representing Great Britain & Ireland): 2004 (winners), 2005 (captain)

See also
2012 Challenge Tour graduates
2016 European Tour Qualifying School graduates

References

External links

Scottish male golfers
European Tour golfers
Golfers from Glasgow
Sportspeople from Clydebank
1987 births
Living people